Khost is town and union council of Harnai District in the Balochistan province of Pakistan. It is located at 30°13'24N 67°34'38E and has an altitude of 1229m (4035ft).

References

Populated places in Sibi District
Union councils of Balochistan, Pakistan